Bachirou Kassimou Osséni (15 December 1985 – 22 October 2019) was a Beninese football player and manager.

Career
Born in Porto-Novo, Osséni played as a midfielder for Olympic Azzaweya, Soleil FC, Vitória B, Diegem Sport, Bodva Moldava nad Bodvou, Portonovo SD and ASOS.

He earned 10 caps for the Benin national team between 2003 and 2005, scoring 1 goal. He was captain of the under-20 team at the 2005 African Youth Championship.

After retiring as a player he became a manager at Etente Kandi.

He died on 22 October 2019, aged 33.

References

1985 births
2019 deaths
Beninese footballers
Benin international footballers
Olympic Azzaweya SC players
Soleil FC players
Vitória F.C. players
K. Diegem Sport players
FK Bodva Moldava nad Bodvou players
3. Liga (Slovakia) players
Portonovo SD players
AS Oussou Saka players
Association football midfielders
Beninese expatriate footballers
Beninese expatriate sportspeople in Libya
Expatriate footballers in Libya
Beninese expatriate sportspeople in Portugal
Expatriate footballers in Portugal
Beninese expatriate sportspeople in Slovakia
Expatriate footballers in Slovakia
Beninese expatriate sportspeople in Spain
Place of death missing
Expatriate footballers in Spain
Beninese football managers
Benin under-20 international footballers
People from Porto-Novo
Libyan Premier League players